Naoyuki Kotani   (born December 8, 1981) is a Japanese mixed martial artist currently competing in the Lightweight division. A professional competitor since 2000, he has formerly competed in PRIDE, Pancrase, UFC, Vale Tudo Japan, and RINGS.

Mixed martial arts career

Early career
Kotani made his professional MMA debut in September 2000 for the RINGS promotion. He was unbeaten for the first three years of his career, earning a record of 13-0-2.

From 2004 to 2005, Kotani suffered a rough patch in his career as he went 3-5-1 against several UFC fighters including Roger Huerta, Yves Edwards, Marcus Aurélio and Rich Clementi.

Ultimate Fighting Championship
Kotani was signed by the UFC in 2007. In his debut, he faced Thiago Tavares at UFC Fight Night: Stevenson vs Guillard on April 5, 2007. He lost the fight via unanimous decision.

For his second fight with the promotion, Kotani faced Dennis Siver at UFC 75 on September 8, 2007. He lost the fight via knockout in the second round.  Following this loss, Kotani was released by the promotion.

Post-UFC
Following his release, Kotani encountered another rough streak as he went 3-3-2 from November 2007 until April 2010. However, beginning in September 2010, Kotani started an undefeated streak of 13-0 over the next three and a half years in his native Japan.

UFC return
In May 2014, it was announced that Kotani had re-signed with the UFC. He made his return against Norman Parke on July 19, 2014 at UFC Fight Night 46. He lost the fight via TKO in the second round.

Kotani then faced Yan Cabral at UFC 179 on October 25, 2014.  He lost the fight via submission in the second round.

Kotani next faced Kajan Johnson on September 27, 2015 at UFC Fight Night 75.  He lost the fight by unanimous decision and was subsequently released from the promotion.

Mixed martial arts record

|-
| Loss
| align=center| 37–18–7 
| Shin Haraguchi
| TKO (elbows and punches)
| Grachan 59 × Brave Fight 27
| 
| align=center|1
| align=center|3:57
| Tokyo, Japan
| 
|-
|Win
| align=center| 37–17–7 
| Yutaka Ueda
| Decision (unanimous)
| Grachan 45
| 
| align=center|2
| align=center|5:00
| Tokyo, Japan
| 
|-
| Loss
| align=center| 36–17–7 
| Koshi Matsumoto
| TKO (knee and punches)
| Shooto 30th Anniversary Tour at Korakuen Hall
| 
| align=center|4
| align=center|0:57
| Tokyo, Japan
| 
|-
|Win
| align=center| 36–16–7 
| Shutaro Debana
| Submission (rear-naked choke)
| Shooto 11/17
| 
| align=center|2
| align=center|0:51
| Tokyo, Japan
| 
|-
|Win
| align=center| 35–16–7 
| Akihito Mamiya
| TKO (punches)
| Grachan 35.5
| 
| align=center|1
| align=center|2:33
| Yokosuka, Kanagawa, Japan
| 
|-
|Loss
| align=center| 34–16–7 
| Marif Piraev
| Decision (unanimous)
| WCFA 44
| 
| align=center|3
| align=center|5:00
| Grozny, Chechnya, Russia
| 
|-
|Loss
| align=center| 34–15–7 
| Yuki Kawana
| Decision (majority)
| Shooto: Professional Shooto 10/15
| 
| align=center|3
| align=center|5:00
| Chiba, Japan
| 
|-
|Win
| align=center| 34–14–7 
| Yoichi Fukumoto
| Submission (Armbar)
| Shooto - Professional Shooto 4/23
| 
| align=center|1
| align=center|2:10
| Chiba, Japan
| 

|-
|Loss
| align=center| 33–14–7 
| Dmitriy Parubchenko
| TKO (punches)
| Real 5: Real Fight Championship 5
| 
| align=center|2
| align=center|3:17
| Tokyo, Japan
| 
|-
|Loss
| align=center| 33–13–7 
| Kajan Johnson
| Decision (unanimous)
| UFC Fight Night: Barnett vs. Nelson
| 
| align=center|3
| align=center|5:00
| Saitama, Japan
| 
|-
| Loss
| align=center| 
| Yan Cabral
| Submission (rear-naked choke)
| UFC 179
| 
| align=center| 2
| align=center| 3:06
| Rio de Janeiro, Brazil
|
|-
| Loss
| align=center| 33–11–7
| Norman Parke
| TKO (punches)
| UFC Fight Night: McGregor vs. Brandao
|  
| align=center| 2
| align=center| 3:41
| Dublin, Ireland
|
|-
| Win
| align=center| 33–10–7
| Yoshihiro Koyama
| Decision (unanimous)
| Vale Tudo Japan: VTJ 4th
| 
| align=center|3
| align=center|5:00
| Tokyo, Japan
|
|-
| Win
| align=center| 32–10–7
| Daisuke Hoshino
| Submission (armbar)
| Vale Tudo Japan: VTJ 3rd
| 
| align=center|1
| align=center|3:57
| Tokyo, Japan
|
|-
| Win
| align=center| 31–10–7
| Vitali Krat
| Submission (armbar)
| RINGS: The Outsider
| 
| align=center|1
| align=center|2:47
| Yokohama, Japan
|
|-
| Win
| align=center| 30–10–7
| Jung Min Kang
| Submission (rear-naked choke)
| ZST.35
| 
| align=center|1
| align=center|2:45
| Tokyo, Japan
|
|-
| Win
| align=center| 29–10–7
| Koji Mori 
| Submission (kneebar)
| ZST.33: 10th Anniversary
| 
| align=center|1
| align=center|1:40
| Tokyo, Japan
|
|-
| Win
| align=center| 28–10–7
| Shinichi Taira
| Decision (unanimous)
| ZST.33: 10th Anniversary
| 
| align=center|2
| align=center|5:00
| Tokyo, Japan
|
|-
| Win
| align=center| 27–10–7
| Darius Minkevicius
| Submission (kimura)
| ZST.32
| 
| align=center| 1
| align=center| 2:42
| Tokyo, Japan
|
|-
| Win
| align=center| 26–10–7
| Ryuki Ueyama
| TKO (punches)
| RINGS: Reincarnation
| 
| align=center| 1
| align=center| 2:32
| Tokyo, Japan
| 
|-
| Win
| align=center| 25–10–7
| Daisuke Hanazawa
| TKO (punches)
| Rings - Battle Genesis Vol. 9
| 
| align=center| 2
| align=center| 4:03
| Tokyo, Japan
| 
|-
| Win
| align=center| 24–10–7
| Katsuya Inoue
| Submission (armbar)
| Pancrase: Impressive Tour 9
| 
| align=center| 1
| align=center| 1:44
| Tokyo, Japan
| 
|-
| Win
| align=center| 23–10–7
| Ryo Asami
| TKO (doctor stoppage)
| RINGS: The Outsider 17
| 
| align=center| 1
| align=center| 1:00
| Tokyo, Japan
| 
|-
| Win
| align=center| 22–10–7
| Keigo Hirayama
| Submission (guillotine choke)
| ZST.27
| 
| align=center| 1
| align=center| 1:44
| Tokyo, Japan
| 
|-
| Win
| align=center| 21–10–7
| Eriya Matsuda
| Submission (heel hook)
| ZST.25
| 
| align=center| 1
| align=center| 1:04
| Tokyo, Japan
| 
|-
| Loss
| align=center| 20–10–7
| Jorge Masvidal
| Decision (split)
| Astra
| 
| align=center| 3
| align=center| 5:00
| Tokyo, Japan
| 
|-
|  Draw
| align=center| 20–9–7
| Kenichi Ito
| Draw
| ZST.23
| 
| align=center| 2
| align=center| 5:00
| Tokyo, Japan
| 
|-
| Win
| align=center| 20–9–6
| Daisuke Nakamura
| Submission (leg scissor choke)
| ZST.22
| 
| align=center| 1
| align=center| 1:37
| Tokyo, Japan
| 
|-
| Win
| align=center| 19–9–6
| Yojiro Uchimura
| Submission (achilles lock)
| ZST.21
| 
| align=center| 1
| align=center| 1:25
| Tokyo, Japan
| 
|-
| Loss
| align=center| 18–9–6
| Kuniyoshi Hironaka
| Submission (reverse full-nelson)
| ZST.20
| 
| align=center| 2
| align=center| 2:43
| Tokyo, Japan
| 
|-
| Win
| align=center| 18–8–6
| Katsuhiko Nagata
| Submission (heel hook)
| ZST.18: Sixth Anniversary
| 
| align=center| 2
| align=center| 4:38
| Tokyo, Japan
| 
|-
| Loss
| align=center| 17–8–6
| Koji Oishi
| Decision (unanimous)
| Pancrase: Shining 8
| 
| align=center| 3
| align=center| 5:00
| Tokyo, Japan
| 
|-
|  Draw
| align=center| 17–7–6
| Masanori Kanehara
| Draw
| ZST.15: Fifth Anniversary
| 
| align=center| 2
| align=center| 5:00
| Tokyo, Japan
| 
|-
| Loss
| align=center| 17–7–5
| Dennis Siver
| KO (punch)
| UFC 75
| 
| align=center| 2
| align=center| 2:04
| London, England
| 
|-
| Loss
| align=center| 17–6–5
| Thiago Tavares
| Decision (unanimous)
| UFC Fight Night: Stevenson vs. Guillard
| 
| align=center| 3
| align=center| 5:00
| Las Vegas, Nevada, United States
| 
|-
| Win
| align=center| 17–5–5
| Masayuki Okude
| Submission (armbar)
| ZST.12
| 
| align=center| 1
| align=center| 0:58
| Tokyo, Japan
| 
|-
|  Draw
| align=center| 16–5–5
| Erikas Petraitis
| Draw
| ZST.11
| 
| align=center| 2
| align=center| 5:00
| Tokyo, Japan
| 
|-
| Win
| align=center| 16–5–4
| Shinya Sato
| Submission (armbar)
| ZST: GT-F2
| 
| align=center| 1
| align=center| 2:09
| Tokyo, Japan
| 
|-
|  Draw
| align=center| 15–5–4
| Darius Skliaudys
| Draw
| ZST.9
| 
| align=center| 2
| align=center| 5:00
| Tokyo, Japan
| 
|-
| Win
| align=center| 15–5–3
| Vito Woods
| Submission (armbar)
| Xtreme Fighting Organization 8
| 
| align=center| 1
| align=center| 1:23
| Illinois, United States
| 
|-
| Loss
| align=center| 14–5–3
| Luiz Azeredo
| KO (punch)
| PRIDE Bushido 9
| 
| align=center| 1
| align=center| 0:11
| Tokyo, Japan
| 
|-
|  Draw
| align=center| 14–4–3
| Darius Skliaudys
| Draw
| ZST Grand Prix 2: Final Round
| 
| align=center| 3
| align=center| 3:00
| Tokyo, Japan
| 
|-
| Loss
| align=center| 14–4–2
| Roger Huerta
| TKO (punches)
| Xtreme Fighting Organization 4
| 
| align=center| 1
| align=center| 1:29
| Illinois, United States
| 
|-
| Loss
| align=center| 14–3–2
| Yves Edwards
| TKO (head kick and punches)
| Euphoria: Road to the Titles
| 
| align=center| 1
| align=center| 3:10
| New Jersey, United States
| 
|-
| Win
| align=center| 14–2–2
| Hideo Tokoro
| Submission (heel hook)
| ZST.6
| 
| align=center| 1
| align=center| 1:44
| Tokyo, Japan
| 
|-
| Win
| align=center| 13–2–2
| Remigijus Morkevicius
| Submission (armbar)
| ZST: Battle Hazard 1
| 
| align=center| 1
| align=center| 2:07
| Tokyo, Japan
| 
|-
| Loss
| align=center| 12–2–2
| Marcus Aurélio
| TKO (doctor stoppage)
| ZST.5
| 
| align=center| 2
| align=center| 3:34
| Tokyo, Japan
| 
|-
| Loss
| align=center| 12–1–2
| Rich Clementi
| Decision (unanimous)
| ZST Grand Prix: Final Round
| 
| align=center| 2
| align=center| 5:00
| Tokyo, Japan
| 
|-
| Win
| align=center| 12–0–2
| Mindaugas Smirnovas
| Submission (armbar)
| ZST Grand Prix: Opening Round
| 
| align=center| 1
| align=center| 0:41
| Tokyo, Japan
| 
|-
| Win
| align=center| 11–0–2
| Mindaugas Smirnovas
| Technical Submission (heel hook)
| ZST 4: The Battle Field 4
| 
| align=center| 1
| align=center| 1:36
| Tokyo, Japan
| 
|-
|  Draw
| align=center| 10–0–2
| Mindaugas Smirnovas
| Draw
| RINGS Lithuania: Bushido RINGS 7: Adrenalinas
| 
| align=center| 3
| align=center| 3:00
| Vilnius, Lithuania
| 
|-
| Win
| align=center| 10–0–1
| Antoine Skinner
| Submission (toe hold)
| ZST 2: The Battle Field 2
| 
| align=center| 1
| align=center| 1:35
| Tokyo, Japan
| 
|-
| Win
| align=center| 9–0–1
| Mindaugas Laurinaitis
| Technical Submission (triangle choke)
| ZST 1: The Battle Field 1
| 
| align=center| 1
| align=center| 2:16
| Tokyo, Japan
| 
|-
| Win
| align=center| 8–0–1
| Kenichi Serizawa
| TKO (punches)
| GCM: Demolition 1
| 
| align=center| 1
| align=center| 0:20
| Japan
| 
|-
| Win
| align=center| 7–0–1
| Masaya Takita
| Submission (triangle armbar)
| GCM: ORG 3rd
| 
| align=center| 1
| align=center| 2:32
| Tokyo, Japan
| 
|-
| Win
| align=center| 6–0–1
| Yoshinobu Ota
| Technical Submission (rear-naked choke)
| RINGS: World Title Series Grand Final
| 
| align=center| 1
| align=center| 1:41
| Yokohama, Japan
| 
|-
| Win
| align=center| 5–0–1
| Takahito Iida
| Submission (armbar)
| RINGS: World Title Series 5
| 
| align=center| 1
| align=center| 3:02
| Yokohama, Japan
| 
|-
| Win
| align=center| 4–0–1
| Hideo Tokoro
| Decision (majority)
| RINGS: Battle Genesis Vol. 8
| 
| align=center| 3
| align=center| 5:00
| Tokyo, Japan
| 
|-
|  Draw
| align=center| 3–0–1
| Jiro Wakabayashi
| Draw
| RINGS: World Title Series 1
| 
| align=center| 3
| align=center| 5:00
| Tokyo, Japan
| 
|-
| Win
| align=center| 3–0
| Curtis Brigham
| Submission (kimura)
| RINGS USA: Battle of Champions
| 
| align=center| 2
| align=center| 1:59
| Iowa, United States
| 
|-
| Win
| align=center| 2–0
| Tashiro Nishiuchi
| Submission (armbar)
| RINGS: Battle Genesis Vol. 6
| 
| align=center| 1
| align=center| 0:32
| Tokyo, Japan
| 
|-
| Win
| align=center| 1–0
| Kiyohito Sugata
| TKO (doctor stoppage)
| RINGS: Battle Genesis Vol. 6
| 
| align=center| 1
| align=center| 0:42
| Tokyo, Japan
|

See also
 List of male mixed martial artists

References

External links
 
 

1981 births
Living people
Japanese male mixed martial artists
Lightweight mixed martial artists
Mixed martial artists utilizing judo
Mixed martial artists utilizing shootboxing
Japanese male judoka
People from Yokosuka, Kanagawa
Ultimate Fighting Championship male fighters
20th-century Japanese people
21st-century Japanese people